Lepidagathis keralensis is a plant species described by PV Madhusoodanan and NP Singh. Lepidagathis keralensis is included in the genus Lepidagathis and the family Acanthaceae. No subspecies are listed in the Catalog of Life.

Gallery

References

Acanthaceae